Nikkita Holder (born May 7, 1987 in East York, Ontario) is a Canadian track and field athlete of Barbadian descent who specialises in the 100 metres hurdles. Holder won the bronze medal at the 2015 Pan American Games in her home country and city in Toronto.

Career
Holder competed at the 2015 Pan American Games. This event took place just one month after her father's death, in the finals she ran toward a bronze setting a season's best at 12.85. After the race she said "Since he’s passed, right before I race I kind of have this moment when I get teary-eyed. It kind of lets me know that he’s here. Getting this medal is a confirmation of my training, how hard I’ve worked emotionally and physically. I’m pretty pleased with myself."

In July 2016 she was officially named to Canada's Olympic team.

Personal
She was married to fellow national track and sprinter Justyn Warner, together they have one child.

Honours
In 2012 Holder was awarded the Queen Elizabeth II Diamond Jubilee Medal.

Achievements

1Disqualified in the semifinals

See also

List of Canadian sports personalities

References

External links
 
  (archive)
 
 
 

1987 births
Living people
Canadian female hurdlers
Black Canadian female track and field athletes
People from East York, Toronto
Athletes from Toronto
Canadian people of Barbadian descent
Athletes (track and field) at the 2012 Summer Olympics
Athletes (track and field) at the 2016 Summer Olympics
Olympic track and field athletes of Canada
Athletes (track and field) at the 2015 Pan American Games
Pan American Games bronze medalists for Canada
Pan American Games medalists in athletics (track and field)
World Athletics Championships athletes for Canada
Medalists at the 2015 Pan American Games